Levi Day Boone (December 6, 1808  – January 24, 1882) served as mayor of Chicago, Illinois (1855–1856) for the American Party (Know-Nothings).

Early life

Boone was born near Lexington, Kentucky, the seventh son of Squire and Anna Grubbs Boone. Squire Boone, Sr. was Daniel Boone's father and Levi Boone's great-grandfather, making Levi Boone Daniel Boone's great-nephew. Young Levi lost his father at the age of 9 when Squire finally succumbed to wounds he suffered at the Battle of Horseshoe Bend.

Despite the poverty the family was plunged into by the death of Squire Boone, Levi graduated from the medical school of Transylvania University in Lexington, Kentucky in 1829 at the age of 21. He moved to Illinois and eventually established a practice in Hillsboro.  In 1832, he served in the Black Hawk War, first in the cavalry and then as a surgeon. In 1833, Dr. Boone married Louise M. Smith, daughter of Theophilus W. Smith, Justice of the Illinois Supreme Court, with whom he had 11 children.

Chicago years

Arriving in Chicago in 1835, he helped organize the Cook County Medical Board and served as the organization's first secretary. Boone had a medical practice with Charles V. Dyer. He was elected the first president of the Chicago Medical Society in 1850.

In 1843, he contributed to the rift in the congregation of Chicago's First Baptist Church by giving a lecture on the scriptural basis of slavery.

In 1850, Boone unsuccessfully ran for Mayor of Chicago. He placed second, receiving 32.90% of the vote (losing to James Curtiss, who received 45.51% of the vote).

Running a second time, Boone was elected mayor in the 1855 Chicago mayoral election. Supported by a coalition of Know Nothings and temperance advocates, Boone ran for mayor on an anti-immigrant platform, along with 7 aldermen running on the same ticket. He defeated incumbent Isaac Lawrence Milliken with nearly 53% of the vote.

During his only year in office, he reorganized the Chicago police, combining the Day Police and the Night Watch into a single police force with 3 eight-hour shifts and requiring the police, for the first time, to wear uniforms. No foreign-born police were retained in the reorganization, and all new appointments were native-born Americans. He barred all immigrants from city jobs. 

Though not a teetotaler, Boone was a temperance advocate and worked to prohibit the sale and consumption of alcohol. Anticipating the passage by referendum of a Maine law to prohibit the sale of beverage alcohol in June 1855, he got the city council to pass an ordinance that raised the cost of liquor licenses from $50 to $300 a year, limited the term to three months, and attempted to enforce an old and disregarded ordinance to close taverns on Sundays. Many saw this as a means of attacking German immigrants, and on April 21, the move sparked the Lager Beer Riot after several tavern owners were arrested for selling beer on a Sunday. The referendum failed in June 1855, by a statewide vote of 54% to 46%.

Boone did not run for re-election in the mayoral election of 1856.

In 1862, Boone was arrested and briefly held in Camp Douglas on suspicion that he had helped a Confederate prisoner to escape.

He died in Chicago on January 24, 1882, and is buried in Rosehill Cemetery.

References

External links
Inaugural Address
Biography at Chicago Public Library

1808 births
1882 deaths
People from Fayette County, Kentucky
Burials at Rosehill Cemetery
Mayors of Chicago
Transylvania University alumni
Illinois Know Nothings
People from Hillsboro, Illinois
American people of the Black Hawk War
American temperance activists
Medicine in Chicago
19th-century American politicians
Chicago City Council members